Barbara Brlec (born 14 April 1972 in Domžale) is a former Slovenian alpine skier who competed in the women's super-G and the women's giant slalom at the 1992 Winter Olympics.

External links
 sports-reference.com
 

1972 births
Living people
Slovenian female alpine skiers
Olympic alpine skiers of Slovenia
Alpine skiers at the 1992 Winter Olympics
People from Domžale
20th-century Slovenian women